Crosskey is an English surname and notable persons include:

 Henry William Crosskey (1826 – 1893), Unitarian minister and geologist
 Roger Ward Crosskey (1930 - 2017), Entomologist
 Thomas Roland Crosskey (1905 – 1971), Scottish cricketer